Taekwondo at the 2010 Summer Youth Olympics took place August 15–19 at the Suntec Singapore International Convention and Exhibition Centre in Singapore.

Competition schedule

Medal summary

Medal table

Boys' events

Girls' events

References

 Schedule and Results by Sport

 
2010 Summer Youth Olympics events
Youth Olympics
2010
Taekwondo in Singapore